Gerald Dupuis (10 August 1904 – 8 August 1960) was a Canadian ski jumper. He competed in the individual event at the 1928 Winter Olympics.

References

1904 births
1960 deaths
Canadian male ski jumpers
Olympic ski jumpers of Canada
Ski jumpers at the 1928 Winter Olympics
Skiers from Montreal